Sasidharan Arattuvazhi (25 August 1955  21 January 2001) was an Indian playwright and screenwriter. Within a career spanning more than two decades, he wrote 20 screenplays and 12 plays.

Biography
Sasi was born at Arattuvazhi in Alappuzha district as the son of Arjunan Pillai. He liked writing plays while still only in school. His first professional stage play was Kolayaali (The Murderer). Later, when Sasi was studying at Sanatana Dharma College, Alappuzha, the craze for writing plays besieged him again. He wrote plays and sent them to All India Radio. Sasi shifted home base to Thiruvananthapuram, where he worked first as a journalist with magazines such as Kudumbakatha and Kuttikatha. He then set up his own advertising agency, Primary Colours. He wrote some of his notable stage plays during this time. Inspired by various screenplays of M. T. Vasudevan Nair, he developed a keen interest in writing screenplays for films. He made his film debut with Kaladharan’s Nettipattom (1991). But the film failed both critically and commercially. He was then approached by Rajasenan, for whom he wrote the family drama Ayalathe Adheham. He went on to write screenplays for 18 more films, including Yoddha, comic thriller CID Unnikrishnan B.A., B.Ed., family drama Kaliveedu, and Cheppadividya. Yoddha, which released on 4 September 1992 is widely regarded as his master piece.

Sasidharan Arattuvazhi died on 21 January 2001 at the age of 45. He was suffering from kidney related diseases for four years. He was survived by his wife Sudhakutty and two daughters.

Filmography
 Jananaayakan (1999)
 Aalibabayum Aarara Kallanmarum (1998)
  Ishtadanam (1997)
 Kilukil Pambaram (1997)
 Kaliveedu (1996)
 Kudumbakodathi (1996)
 Simhavalan Menon (1995)
 Avittam Thirunaal Aarogya Sriman (1995)
 Varam (1993)
 Cheppadividya
 CID Unnikrishnan B.A., B.Ed. (1994)
 Pidakkozhi Koovunna Noottandu (1994)
 Vardhakyapuranam (1994)
 Porutham
 Pravachakan (1993)
 Yoddha (1992)
 Ayalathe Adheham (1992)
Nettippattom (1991)

References

External links
 

2001 deaths
Writers from Alappuzha
Malayalam-language writers
Malayalam screenwriters
Indian male screenwriters
Malayalam-language dramatists and playwrights
1955 births
Screenwriters from Thiruvananthapuram
Indian male dramatists and playwrights
20th-century Indian dramatists and playwrights
20th-century Indian male writers
20th-century Indian screenwriters